Gary Binfield (13 March 1966 – 14 March 2008) was a British swimmer.

Swimming career
Binfield competed in two events at the 1988 Summer Olympics. He represented England in the backstroke and individual medley events, at the 1986 Commonwealth Games in Edinburgh, Scotland. Four years later he once again represented England in the backstroke and medley events and won a silver medal in the 4 x 100 metres medley relay, at the 1990 Commonwealth Games in Auckland, New Zealand. He also won the 1987 and 1989 ASA National Championship title in the 100 metres backstroke the 1986, 1988 and 1989 champion in 200 metres backstroke, was the 1987 champion in 200 metres medley and the 1984 champion in the 400 metres medley.

References

External links
 

1966 births
2008 deaths
British male swimmers
Olympic swimmers of Great Britain
Swimmers at the 1988 Summer Olympics
People from Milton Keynes
Commonwealth Games medallists in swimming
Commonwealth Games silver medallists for England
Swimmers at the 1986 Commonwealth Games
Swimmers at the 1990 Commonwealth Games
Sportspeople from Buckinghamshire
Medallists at the 1990 Commonwealth Games